Henry Thomas d'Entremont (February 28, 1859 – March 30, 1920) was a merchant and political figure in Nova Scotia, Canada. He represented Yarmouth County in the Nova Scotia House of Assembly from 1916 to 1920 as a Liberal member.

Early life
He was born in Lower East Pubnico, Yarmouth County, Nova Scotia, the son of George David d'Entremont and Catherine Murphy. His grandfather was Simon d'Entremont, the first Acadian elected to a legislative assembly in North America.

Career
He opened a general store in Lower East Pubnico in June 1883; he also shipped mackerel, lobster, halibut and blueberries for sale in the United States. D'Entremont married Sophia LeBlanc.

Death
He died in office in Lower East Pubnico at the age of 61.

References 
 A Directory of the Members of the Legislative Assembly of Nova Scotia, 1758-1958, Public Archives of Nova Scotia (1958)

1859 births
1920 deaths
Nova Scotia Liberal Party MLAs
People from Yarmouth County